Bonbon is a commune in the Jérémie Arrondissement, in the Grand'Anse department of Haiti. The non-profit organization Sant Demen is establishing a learning center for the Haitian community in the area. It has 6,754 inhabitants.

The village of Desarmeaux is also located in the commune.

References

Populated places in Grand'Anse (department)
Communes of Haiti